Selene orstedii, the Mexican moonfish, is a species of ray-finned fish within the family Carangidae. The species is found in the eastern Pacific Ocean, off the coasts of Baja California, Mexico to Ecuador. It grows to a max length of 33 centimeters, but is more commonly found at 25 centimeters in length. Adults are found in shallow coastal waters at depths up to 50 meters below sea level, usually near the seafloor. Its diet consist of squid, small crabs, small fishes and polychaetes.

Conversation 
Selene orstedii currently has no known major threats, although it is often caught in artisanal fisheries through the use of gill nets, and is an important species of commercial fish in the Gulf of Montijo, Panama. There are currently no specific conservation efforts for the species, and its distribution already overlaps with marine protected areas within the eastern Pacific. It has been classified as a 'Least concern' species by the IUCN Red List.

References 

Fish described in 1880
Fish of the Pacific Ocean
Fish of Mexican Pacific coast
Fish of Colombia
Fish of Central America
IUCN Red List least concern species
Least concern biota of Mexico
Fish of Ecuador
orstedii